Benthofascis lozoueti is a species of sea snail, a marine gastropod mollusk in the family Conorbidae.

These snails are predatory and venomous. They are capable of "stinging" humans, therefore live ones should be handled carefully or not at all.

Description
The length of an adult shell attains 21.5 mm, its diameter 9.1 mm.

Distribution
This marine species is endemic to the Norfolk Ridge and found at a depth of 530 m; also off New Caledonia.

References

 Sysoev A. & Bouchet P. (2001) New and uncommon turriform gastropods (Gastropoda: Conoidea) from the South-West Pacific. In: P. Bouchet & B.A. Marshall (eds), Tropical Deep-Sea Benthos, volume 22. Mémoires du Muséum National d'Histoire Naturelle 185: 271–320. page(s): 290

External links
 
 Bouchet, Philippe, et al. "A quarter-century of deep-sea malacological exploration in the South and West Pacific: where do we stand? How far to go." Tropical deep-sea Benthos 25 (2008): 9-40
 Holotype at the MNHN, Paris

lozoueti